The 2010 Kontinental Hockey League All-Star Game was the All-Star game for the  2009–10 Kontinental Hockey League (KHL) season. It took place on 30 January 2010, at the new Minsk-Arena in Minsk, Belarus. As in the previous year, Team Jágr won against Team Yashin, this time with a score of 11–8.

Nominations
As in the previous year, the format for the game was "Team Yashin" (Russia) vs. "Team Jágr" (World). The teams were named after players who are highly recognized in the sport worldwide and in particular in their respective countries. The participating players were nominated by the public, by the media, and by the KHL.

Skills Competition Winners
The Fastest Skater — Denis Parshin 
Shootout Skill — Shootout Winner Marcel Hossa; Best Shootout — Jozef Stümpel
Long Range Shot — Dmitri Kalinin
Zigzag Team Relay — Team Yashin
Accurate Shooting — Aleksey Morozov
Speed Relay — Team Yashin
Hardest shot — Karel Rachůnek

Rosters

*International player's flags indicate nation of origin whereas Russian born player's flags indicate the Federal subject of origin

See also
2009–10 KHL season
Kontinental Hockey League All-Star Game

References

External links
 Official homepage
 Stats of game

2010
All Star Game
Sports competitions in Minsk
2010 in Belarusian sport